Sudjiatmi Notomihardjo (15 February 1943 – 25 March 2020) was the mother of Joko Widodo, Indonesia's current president. Along with her husband, Widjiatno Notomihardjo, she was a wood trader from Solo.

Biography 
Sudjiatmi was born on 15 February 1943 in Boyolali, Central Java, as the second child and only daughter of Wiroredjo and Insani "Sani" Wiroredjo (1913 – 23 October 2015). Her brothers were Miyono Suryo Sarjono (1940 – 27 February 2022) and Setiawan Prasetyo (born ).

Her father Wiroredjo was a wood traders from Giriroto, Ngemplak, Boyolali, and her mother Sani was a housewife.

Later, she ran her wood business with her husband, Widjiatno Notomihardjo, although it was not very successful and the newly married couple struggled at the beginning of their marriage.

References

1943 births
2020 deaths
Indonesian Muslims
People from Boyolali Regency
Joko Widodo
Javanese people